"All The Stars" is a song recorded by American rapper Kendrick Lamar and American singer SZA. Written by Lamar, SZA, Sounwave, and Al Shux and produced by the latter two, the song was released on January 4, 2018, as the lead single to the soundtrack album of the film Black Panther. Its release coincided with Top Dawg Entertainment's announcement that its president, Anthony "Top Dawg" Tiffith, and Lamar himself would be producing the Black Panther soundtrack album. Marvel Studios confirmed the news and revealed that Lamar was hand-picked by Black Panthers director, Ryan Coogler, to produce the soundtrack album. The song appeared in the movie during the end credits.

"All The Stars" received numerous accolades and nominations including a nomination for Best Original Song at the 76th Golden Globe Awards and the 91st Academy Awards, as well as receiving four nominations at the 61st Grammy Awards including Record of the Year and Song of the Year.

"All The Stars" won Best Song at the African-American Film Critics Association, while its video won Best Visual Effects at the 2018 MTV Video Music Awards.

Background
Lamar first hinted at his involvement with the Black Panther soundtrack album in the music video for his song "Love", released on December 22, 2017. In the video, at about 1:54 into the song, a clapperboard is shown with the words "B.Panther Soundtrack Coming Soon". Lamar subsequently announced his involvement on January 4, 2018, along with the release of "All The Stars".

Release
Upon its release, Lamar announced his praise for Black Panther and its director, Ryan Coogler, writing "the magnitude of [the] film showcases a great marriage of art and culture. I'm truly honored to contribute my knowledge of producing sound and writing music alongside Ryan and Marvel's vision."

Reception
"All The Stars" received positive reviews from critics. Jon Blistein of Rolling Stone praised the song, calling Lamar's verse "defiant" and SZA's verse "enthralling" and "filled with vocal turns". However, Sheldon Pearce of Pitchfork gave the song a negative review, calling it "generic" and "pales in comparison to [Lamar and SZA's] recent works". Pearce further wrote that the song is "full of heavy-handed plotting and everyman cliches" and is "so nondescript that it reeks of compromise, devoid of personality or any true vision." Although Pearce complimented Lamar and SZA's performances and the "slick production", he ultimately wrote that "'All the Stars' is uncharacteristically conservative for these two stars, all in service of a bigger picture."

In December 2018, Billboard ranked "All The Stars" as the 15th best song of the year.

Chart performance
In the week ending January 20, 2018, "All The Stars" debuted at number 43 on the Billboard Hot 100. During its fifth week on the chart, it managed to rise to number 31 on the Hot 100, and in the week ending March 3, 2018, the single reached number seven on the Hot 100. It is Lamar's second top ten hit on the chart in 2018, following his collaboration with The Weeknd on "Pray for Me", which reached number seven in early February. It also became SZA's second top ten hit on the chart following her collaboration with Maroon 5 on the hit single "What Lovers Do". On the Hot R&B/Hip-Hop Songs, "All The Stars" debuted at number 19 and stayed in the top 20 for three weeks. In its fifth week, it rose to number five on the chart.

Worldwide, the song peaked at number one in Malaysia, Mexico, Singapore, and Slovakia. The song reached the top ten in Australia, Canada, Hungary, Ireland, New Zealand, Norway, Sweden, and the United Kingdom.

Music video
The music video for the song was filmed in January 2018 and released to Lamar's Vevo channel on YouTube on February 6, 2018. It was directed by Dave Meyers and the Little Homies. As of April 2021, the video has over 290 million views.

The video features themes and images of Afrocentrism and Afrofuturism, referencing the visual language of the film. The beginning of the video references to the Middle Passage, with appearances of Fulani hats, La Sape, Pantsula, Kufi caps, traditional African masks, and Kandake at the end. The video also features a sequence where Lamar walks alongside several panthers referencing the Black Panther soundtrack album.

Copyright infringement
In February 2018, British-Liberian artist Lina Iris Viktor claimed that images of her 24-karat gold patterned artwork were used in the music video without her permission. A settlement agreement was reached in principle on December 20.

Awards and nominations

Personnel
Credits adapted from digital booklet.

Performers
 Kendrick Lamar – vocals
 SZA – vocals

Technical
 Matt Schaeffer – record engineering, mix engineering
 Mike Bozzi – master engineering
 Sam Ricci – record engineering
 James Hunt – record engineering
 Lorenzo Richards - record engineering

Production
 Ezinma – string arrangement
 Sounwave – production
 Al Shux – production

Charts

Weekly charts

Year-end charts

Certifications

Release history

See also
 List of number-one songs of 2018 (Malaysia)
 List of number-one songs of 2018 (Singapore)
 Billboard Year-End Hot 100 singles of 2018

References

External links
 

2018 singles
2018 songs
Black Panther (film series)
Kendrick Lamar songs
SZA songs
Song recordings produced by Al Shux
Songs written by Kendrick Lamar
Songs written by SZA
Songs written by Al Shux
Songs written by Sounwave
Marvel Cinematic Universe songs
Music videos directed by Dave Meyers (director)
Number-one singles in Malaysia
Number-one singles in Singapore
Aftermath Entertainment singles
Interscope Records singles
Top Dawg Entertainment singles